Christine Mary Elizabeth Burrows (4 January 1872 – 10 September 1959) was a British academic administrator who the second Principal of St Hilda's College, Oxford, from 1910 to 1919 and the second Principal of St Anne's College, Oxford, from 1921 to 1929.

Early life 
She was born in Chipping Norton, Oxfordshire on 4 January 1872 and educated at Cheltenham Ladies’ College. The daughter of Esther Elizabeth Burrows and Henry Parker Burrows; her father, a businessman, died before she was born and her mother was the first principal of St Hilda's. 

She began studying history at Lady Margaret Hall, Oxford but had to postpone her studies when her mother took up her role at St Hilda's in 1893. She continued her studies as a Home-Student and completed her exams in 1894.  As women students could not earn degrees from Oxford at the time, she did not receive her MA until 1921.

Career 
Burrows became a History tutor at St Hilda's in 1894 and Vice Principal in 1895. She succeeded her mother as Principal in 1910 but resigned from the position in 1919 to care for her ailing mother.

In 1920, she and five others represented the British Federation of University Women at the International Federation of University Women meeting in London. 

In 1921, she became Principal of the Society of Oxford Home-Students (now St Anne's College, Oxford) as she could continue her caring duties alongside the role while living at home. 

In 1926, she served as principal of an Oxford summer course for over 200 American women students. In 1929, she again resigned her position to care for her mother, who died in 1935. 

In her retirement, Burrows served on a committee of the Church of England on the place of women in the church and wrote a history of St. Hilda's College.

Death 
Burrows died at St Luke's Home, Linton Road, Oxford, on 10 September 1959. Following a funeral at St Giles' Church, Oxford, her body was cremated.

References

External links 

 A painted portrait of Christine Burrows, from about 1920, at Art UK.
 A photograph of Christine Burrows from 1950, in the National Portrait Gallery.

1872 births
1959 deaths
Principals of St Anne's College, Oxford
Principals of St Hilda's College, Oxford
People from Chipping Norton
Alumni of Lady Margaret Hall, Oxford